The Pala della Peste (Altarpiece of the Bubonic Plague) or Pallione del Voto is an oil on silk Baroque-style altarpiece by Guido Reni depicts the Madonna and Child in Glory with the Patron Saints of Bologna: Petronius, Francis, Ignatius, Francis Xavier, Proculus of Bologna, and Florian.

Description
The altarpiece was painted in 1631–1632 as an ex voto after the ebbing of the plague epidemic in 1630 in Bologna. The altarpiece was in the past paraded yearly in a formal procession from the Palazzo Pubblico to the church of San Domenico, Bologna.

The structure of the painting follows the formal arrangement, exemplified by a late 16th-century canvas by Annibale Carraci in the Pinacoteca of Bologna. The Madonna and child are in the superior portion. The infant blesses with his right hand, while the left hand holds a flowering sprig. Around the couple, cherubim are active draping flowers, holding rosaries and scapulars, and crowning the Virgin with a floral crown.

In the scene below, the seven saints implore for Bologna, depicted at the bottom center. Charles Borromeo, recently canonized, at the left was known for his work among the pestilent of Milan. Beside him standing is St Proculus of Bologna, a martyred Roman soldier, holding a sword and palm leaf (symbol of Martyrdom). Across the canvas, the armored St Florian holds a halberd and palm leaf. Kneeling below are: St Petronius with a bishop's mitre at his feet; St Francis in a cassock, and to the right are two Jesuit saints, Francis Xavier with the palm leaf pointing to him, and the founder of the order St Ignatius of Loyola. St. Dominic kneeling with the lily of purity on the right.

The style recalls the earthy coloring of Ludovico Carracci. The work is now in the Pinacoteca of Bologna, which also has a 1616 ex voto Madonna by Reni. The Palla delle Peste is described by Viardot as "an excellent specimen of the pale coloring which Guido had adopted".

References

External sources
See Mutual Art for an in-depth discussion on this painting by Catherine R. Puglisi / The Art Bulletin (1995).

1631 paintings
1632 paintings
Paintings in the collection of the Pinacoteca Nazionale di Bologna
Paintings by Guido Reni
Paintings of the Madonna and Child
Angels in art
Paintings of Francis of Assisi
Epidemics in art